Lucius Aemilius L.f. Mamercinus was a Roman patrician of the fourth century BC.  He was consular tribune in 377, magister equitum in 368 and 352, consul in 366 and 363, and interrex in 355 BC.

See also
Aemilia (gens)

References

4th-century BC Roman consuls
Year of birth unknown
Year of death unknown
Mamercinus, Lucius
Roman patricians